Louis James Gordon (July 15, 1908 – April 4, 1976) was an American professional football player.

Biography
Gordonwas born in Chicago, Illinois, and was Jewish.

He played college football at the University of Illinois, where Gordon was a consensus All American tackle in 1929.

A lineman, Gordon played nine seasons in the National Football League. He was a four-time all-league selection was captain of the Cardinals for three seasons. Because helmets gave him headaches, he often played without a helmet. His career ended after he suffered a badly broken leg in his only Bears season.

Hall of fame
Gordon was inducted into the Chicago Jewish Sports Hall of Fame.

See also
List of select Jewish football players

References

1908 births
1976 deaths
American football ends
American football guards
American football tackles
Brooklyn Dodgers (NFL) players
Chicago Bears players
Chicago Cardinals players
Green Bay Packers players
Illinois Fighting Illini football players
Players of American football from Chicago
Jewish American sportspeople
20th-century American Jews